Scott Lake is a lake in Grant County, in the U.S. state of Minnesota.

Scott Lake was named after a local farmer.

See also
List of lakes in Minnesota

References

Lakes of Minnesota
Lakes of Grant County, Minnesota